Allium hemisphaericum is a species of onion endemic to the Island of Sicily in the Mediterranean.

Little is known about Allium hemisphaericum.

References

hemisphaericum
Onions
Flora of Sicily
Plants described in 1988